Kalpush District is a district (bakhsh) in Meyami County, Semnan Province, Iran. At the 2006 census, its population was 16,351, in 3,957 families.  The District has no cities. The District has two rural districts (dehestan): Nardin Rural District and Rezvan Rural District.

References 

Districts of Semnan Province
Meyami County
2011 establishments in Iran